Wangui wa Goro (born 1961) is a Kenyan academic, social critic, researcher, translator and writer based in the UK. As a public intellectual she has an interest in the development of African languages and literatures, as well as being consistently involved with the promotion of literary translation internationally, regularly speaking and writing on the subject. 
Professor Wangui wa Goro is a writer, translator, translation studies scholar and pioneer who has lived and lectured in different parts of the world including the UK, USA, Germany and South Africa.

Early life and education
She was born in Kenya but left to study in Europe for her undergraduate studies in Modern Languages and Economics at the University of Leicester. She continued to pursue her studies in education at the then University of London (now part of the University College of London), and later her doctoral studies in Translation Studies at Middlesex University.

Career
In 2020, she was awarded an Honorary Professorship at SOAS University of London and appointed as a Visiting Professor at King's College London.

She has worked in local government, also as an academic in the humanities in the UK, and additionally in international development contexts.

Owing to her activism and involvement in human rights activism for democracy in Kenya, Wa Goro lived in exile in England for many years. She supported many movements for justice and freedom, including the Anti-Apartheid Movement, and was also involved in the women's movement as a feminist, working to pioneer Black and African Feminist work in the UK and in Europe.

She has translated the works of award-winning authors, including Ngũgĩ wa Thiong'o's satire Matigari and his children's works Njamba Nene and the Flying Bus (1986) and Njamba Nene's Pistol (1990), from Gikuyu into English, as well as Véronique Tadjo's poetry book A vol d'oiseau (As the Crow Flies, Heinemann African Writers Series, 2001) from French.

Wa Goro's own writing encompasses poetry, essays, short stories, fiction and non-fiction. Her short story "Heaven and Earth" (Macmillan) has been taught on the Kenyan curriculum. She has also been an active campaigner for human rights in Africa and Europe, and co-edited with Kelly Coate and Suki Ali the book Global Feminist Politics: Identities in a Changing World (Routledge, 2001). Publications to which she has contributed include Under the Tree of Talking: Leadership for Change in Africa (2007), edited by Onyekachi Wambu, the 2006 anthology African Love Stories, edited by Ama Ata Aidoo, and New Daughters of Africa (2019), edited by Margaret Busby.

She is a regular participant at the Royal African Society's annual literature and book festival Africa Writes, among other events curating the symposium "Africa in Translation" that features writers, artists, publishers, translators, readers and scholars, under the aegis of SIDENSi, an international organisation set up "to promote translation, traducture and information knowledge management across disciplines".  She is also the founder member of TRACALA, the Translation Caucus of the African Literature Association.

Over the years she has also been on advisory committees or boards of numerous organisations, including the Women's Studies Network UK, the British Centre for Literary Translation, the Arts Council England, PEN International and the African Literature Association. She has served as a council member of the Caine Prize for African Writing, for which she was a judge in 2007.

Awards and honours
She is the recipient of the 2021 Flora Nwapa Society Award.

References

External links
 Wangui wa Goro, "Deconstructing culture in Africa", Pambazuka News, Issue 278, 16 November 2006.
 Kalamu ya Salaam, "Tarzan Can Not Return to Africa But I Can — S-T-U-V-W-X-Y-Z: PANAFEST 1994", ChickenBones: A Journal.
 "Wangui wa Goro - Translation as fusion in global Igbo/African pasts and futures". Wangui wa Goro delivering the keynote lecture at the 5th Annual Igbo Conference on Igbo Fusions: Past, Present and Futures.
 "Interview: Peter Thompson and Wangui wa Goro on Translation", Journal of the African Literature Association, Volume 5, 2010 - Issue 1, pp. 189–197. Published online: 4 April 2016.

1961 births
Living people
Kenyan academics
Kenyan writers
Kenyan women writers
Translators to English
Academics of SOAS University of London